Colonel John Douglas Slim, 2nd Viscount Slim,  (20 July 1927 – 12 January 2019), was a British peer, soldier and businessman. He was one of the 92 elected hereditary peers in the House of Lords, elected to remain after the passing of the House of Lords Act 1999. In 1970, he succeeded to his father's title. He sat as a crossbencher.

Life and work
The son of Aileen ( Robertson) and William Slim (later the 1st Viscount Slim), he was born in Quetta in British India and was educated at Prince of Wales Royal Indian Military College in Dehradun. In 1944, Slim joined the 6th Gurkha Rifles of the British Indian Army and was later transferred to the Argyll and Sutherland Highlanders in 1948. He entered the Special Air Service in 1952. From 1961, he was instructor at the Staff College, Camberley, and from 1964 at the Joint Services Staff College. In 1972, he retired from the armed forces at the rank of lieutenant colonel with a later honorary promotion to colonel. He was appointed an Officer of the Order of the British Empire the following year.

Slim was chairman of Peek plc from 1976 to 1991, deputy chairman from 1991 to 1996, and eventually consultant from 1996 to 2003. He was further director of Trailfinders travel company and Trustee of the Royal Commonwealth Ex-Services League (RCEL). From 1971 until his death he was president of the Burma Star Association and from 2000 president of the SAS Association. He was also Patron of Prospect Burma, a London-based charity that offers higher education scholarships to Burmese students as well as the Graham Layton Trust, a British charity which helps to raise money for eyecare in Pakistan.

From 2005 to 2016 Slim was Patron of the Burma Children's Fund a UK Charity supporting children's education and health care in Burma. Having been chairman in the past, he was vice-president of the Britain–Australia Society. From 1977 to 1996, he was vice-chairman of the Arab-British Chamber of Commerce. In 1983, Slim was made a Fellow of the Royal Geographical Society. Between 1995 and 1996, he was also Master of the Worshipful Company of Clothworkers. He served as an honorary chairman of The OSS Society.

Slim was married to cordon bleu chef Elisabeth Spinney from 1958 until her death in 2018. They had two sons, Mark William Rawdon Slim (born 1960) and Hugo John Robertson Slim (born 1961), and a daughter, Mary Ann Elisabeth Slim (born 1964).

Slim died on 12 January 2019, aged 91.

Arms

References

External links
 

1927 births
2019 deaths
Deputy Lieutenants of Greater London
Fellows of the Royal Geographical Society
Officers of the Order of the British Empire
Viscounts in the Peerage of the United Kingdom
Crossbench hereditary peers
British Indian Army officers
Argyll and Sutherland Highlanders officers
Special Air Service officers
Military personnel of British India
Academics of the Staff College, Camberley

Hereditary peers elected under the House of Lords Act 1999